This page lists the women's qualification results of the 2017 Artistic Gymnastics World Championships.

Individual all-around

References 

Women's
2017 in women's gymnastics